The Church of San Marcos (Spanish: Iglesia de San Marcos) is a parish church located in Madrid, Spain. It was designed by Ventura Rodríguez, and it one of a number of surviving buildings by this architect in the city.

Conservation 
It was declared Bien de Interés Cultural in 1944.

See also 
Catholic Church in Spain
List of oldest church buildings

References 

Marcos
Bien de Interés Cultural landmarks in Madrid
Buildings and structures in Universidad neighborhood, Madrid